Comic-Con Russia is a speculative fiction entertainment annual exhibition and fan convention of computer and video games, TV series and comic movies in Russia, organized by the committee of the Russian Game Developers Conference and Bubble Comics. First convention was held alongside the 2014 IgroMir.

From the beginning the showcasing primarily comic books and science fiction/fantasy related film, television, and similar popular arts, the convention includes a larger range of pop culture and entertainment elements across virtually all genres, including horror, animation, anime, manga, toys, collectible card games, video games, webcomics, and fantasy novels in the country.

See also 
 San Diego Comic-Con International
 East European Comic Con
 Russian Game Developers Conference
 IgroMir

References

External links 
 
 Comic-Con Russia

Festivals in Moscow
Video game trade shows
Video gaming in Russia
Multigenre conventions
Comics conventions
Recurring events established in 2014
2014 establishments in Russia